WLJT-DT (channel 11), branded on-air as West TN PBS, is a PBS member television station licensed to Lexington, Tennessee, United States, serving western and northwestern Tennessee. The station is owned by the West Tennessee Public Television Council, and maintains studios in Martin on rented space at the University of Tennessee at Martin; its transmitter is located on U.S. Route 412 midway between Jackson and Lexington.

History

WLJT began operations on February 13, 1968. It was originally operated by the Tennessee Department of Education as a service to the schools of western Tennessee. At the time, this region was considered too thinly populated and too rural to support a full-fledged traditional educational station.  As such, for its first 13 years of broadcasting, it repeated the signal of Memphis station WKNO (channel 10), via contract, since WKNO was not, unlike WLJT, operated by the state.

In the early 1980s, a state report had recommended that WKNO take over WLJT outright. However, the Memphis station had no interest, and in 1981, the Tennessee state government passed the Educational Television Act of 1981, which committed the state to spinning off its four noncommercial television stations. At the same time, the West Tennessee Public Television Council was formed, and WLJT began local programming from studios at UT–Martin. In April 1984, the spin-off was completed.

In 1981, the station inaugurated a separate schedule, including programs of local interest. A few years later, the state education board relinquished the license to a local community board, the West Tennessee Public Television Council.

WLJT especially emphasizes programs of community interest, in large part because commercial broadcasters in Memphis and Paducah, Kentucky devote little attention to rural western Tennessee in newscasts and other local programming. The only commercial news operation in the market explicitly devoted to the area is Jackson ABC affiliate WBBJ-TV (channel 7).

After the digital transition on February 17, 2009, WLJT discontinued transmitting on its analog signal, continuing to operate on digital channel 47. However, digital tuners with PSIP display its virtual channel as "11". WLJT-DT moved to digital channel 27 effective August 10, 2018.

Subchannels
The station's digital signal is multiplexed:

References

External links
Official website

LJT-DT
PBS member stations
Television channels and stations established in 1968
1968 establishments in Tennessee
Henderson County, Tennessee